The National People's Congress Environment Protection and Resources Conservation Committee is one of nine special committees of the National People's Congress, the national legislature of the People's Republic of China. The special committee was created during the first session of the 8th National People's Congress in March 1993, and has existed for every National People's Congress since.

Chairpersons

References 

Environmental policy in China
Environment Protection and Resources Conservation Committee